Major General Saad Maan Ibrahim Jassim al-Musawi (born 4 August 1972) is a senior Iraqi Ground Forces officer serving as the Director of the Department of Relations and Information.

Education 
 Bachelor of Arts English language - Al Turath University College - Baghdad 1994
 Police Sciences High Diploma, High Institute of Internal Security officers- Baghdad 1995
 Bachelor, Media, Media College, University of Baghdad 2001
 Master, Media, College of Media, University of Baghdad, a thesis entitled " Media Monitoring and Democratization in Iraq" 2007
 Ph.D. Media, College of Media, Baghdad University, a dissertation entitled "The role of Television in Spreading the Culture of Human Rights, A Survey for Prisoners in Iraqi Prisons" 2011

Posts 
 Secretary of the Minister of Interior, Ministry of Interior, Minister Office  2003 - 2004
 Secretary of the Inspector General, Ministry of Interior  2004 - 2005
 Director of the Office of Information and Public Relations, Ministry of Interior, Inspector General Office 2005 - 2006
 Foreign relations officer Ministry of Interior, Directorate of Interior Affairs 2006
 Officer of Planning and Statistics, General Directorate of Traffic, Ministry of Interior 2007
 Human Rights Officer, General Directorate of Internal Affairs and Security, South Office 2007
 Associate Director of the Department of Human Rights, Ministry of Interior 2007
 Director of Media Department of General Directorate of Interior Affaires and Security on 2008, in addition to his duties in the Department of Human Rights.
 Director of the Department of Media, Ministry of Interior 2011 - 2018.
 Director of Relations and Information Office, Ministry of Interior 2018 - present.

See also 
Ministry of Interior (Iraq)

References 

Iraqi military personnel
Living people
1972 births
Iraqi Muslims
University of Baghdad alumni